Bermudian Creek is a  tributary of Conewago Creek in Adams and York counties in Pennsylvania in the United States.

Bermudian Creek joins Conewago Creek north of Pickett Hill and just south of Detters Mill.

Tributaries
Mud Run
Latimore Creek

See also
List of rivers of Pennsylvania

References

External links
U.S. Geological Survey: PA stream gaging stations

Rivers of Pennsylvania
Tributaries of the Susquehanna River
Rivers of York County, Pennsylvania
Rivers of Adams County, Pennsylvania